Hawkesbury or Hawksbury may refer to:

People
Baron Hawkesbury, or Charles Jenkinson, 1st Earl of Liverpool (1727-1808), English statesman

Places
Geography
Hawkesbury Island, an island in British Columbia, Canada
Hawkesbury Island, Queensland, an island in Australia
Hawkesbury River, a river in New South Wales, Australia

Settlements
Hawkesbury, Ontario, a town in Ontario, Canada
City of Hawkesbury a local government area in New South Wales, Australia
Port Hawkesbury, a town in Nova Scotia, Canada
Hawkesbury, Gloucestershire, a village in Gloucestershire, England, UK
Hawkesbury Village, a village in Warwickshire, England, UK
Hawksbury, New Zealand is a locality near Waikouaiti, New Zealand

Political divisions
Electoral district of Hawkesbury, a seat in the New South Wales Legislative Assembly

Locations
Hawkesbury Airport, or Hawkesbury (West) Airport (TC: CNV4), Ontario, Canada
Hawkesbury (East) Airport (TC: CPG5), Ontario, Canada
Hawkesbury (Windover Field) Airport (TC: CPD8), Ontario, Canada
Port Hawkesbury Airport (IATA: YPS, ICAO: CYPD), Nova Scotia, Canada

Ships
HMCS Hawkesbury, a ship of the Royal Canadian Navy
HMAS Hawkesbury, two ships of the Royal Australian Navy

Other uses
Hawkesbury Agricultural College, New South Wales, Australia (1891-1989)

See also
East Hawkesbury, Ontario, Canada
Hawkesbury and Nepean Wars, Australia